Franz Ziehl (13 April 1857 in Wismar – 7 April 1926) was a German bacteriologist. He was a professor in Lübeck.

Franz Ziehl introduced the carbol fuchsin stain for the tubercle bacillus in 1882. With pathologist Friedrich Neelsen (1854–1898), he developed the Ziehl–Neelsen stain, also known as the acid-fast stain, which is used to identify acid-fast bacteria.

External links 
 Mondofacto Dictionary  (definitions)

1857 births
1926 deaths
German bacteriologists
Physicians from Lübeck
People from Wismar
People from the Grand Duchy of Mecklenburg-Schwerin